Mereoni Tora (born 26 October 1998) is a Fijian footballer who plays as a defender. She has been a member of the Fiji women's national team.

In August 2018 she was named to the Fijian team for the 2018 OFC Women's Nations Cup.

Notes

References

1998 births
Living people
Women's association football defenders
Fijian women's footballers
Fiji women's international footballers